Mustilizans shennongi is a moth in the family Endromidae. It was described by Yang Jikun and Mao Xiaoyuan in 1995. It is found in Hubei, China.

References

Moths described in 1995
Mustilizans